V. R. Prabodhachandran Nayar (also spelled Prabodhachandran Nair), popularly known as VRP Nayar, is a Phonetics expert of Kerala. He is the pioneer in the study of the phonology of the Malayalam language. Apart from phonology, he is also interested in syntax and stylistics.

Professional career
VRP Nayar commenced his professional career in 1959 when he was 20, as a lecturer in Malayalam in the South Travancore Hindu College Nagercoil (Kanyakumari District, Tamil Nadu), the then southernmost college in India. He retired as Head of the department of Linguistics, University of Kerala, Trivandrum, in August 1998. However, he is active as a teacher and was working as a Visiting Professor-cum-Coordinator, at Department of Linguistics, Central University of Kerala, Kasaragod during the years 2012 and 2013.

Association with South Travancore Hindu College, helped him have exposure first to colloquial Tamil and in due course, to the classical language and literature in Tamil.
Concurrently he progressed with his PhD program as a part-time Research Scholar under the guidance of Dean Professor / Dr PK Narayana Pillai, in the Department of Oriental Studies, University of Kerala. He was the first recipient of University Grants Commission (India)'s’s Junior Research Fellowship in the Faculty of Oriental Studies in the University. In May 1963 he joined as the only Lecturer in the University's newly established Department of Linguistics and in 1965 submitted his PhD thesis entitled Descriptive Grammar of Krishnagatha, one of the oldest and classic poetic works by the legendary Malayalam poet Cherusseri Namboothiri. In 1967 Dr Nayar was granted a Commonwealth Scholarship for research in Phonetics and Linguistics at the School of Oriental and African Studies in the University of London. His studies in London overshot their stipulated aims, in the sense that he successfully completed another thesis called Malayalam Verbal Forms– A Phonetic and Phonological Study Supported by Experimental Findings which fetched him his second PhD. During this period of research he could make a study tour of a number of libraries and speech-laboratories in the UK as well as in France, the Netherlands, Belgium and Germany.
Rejoining his parent Department in Thiruvananthapuram, Dr Nayar was promoted as Reader and subsequently as Professor and in 1981 as Chair-Professor, which position he held till his retirement in 1998. Simultaneously he served on several occasions in the following positions also:   Member /  Chair, Board of Studies in Linguistics;  Member /  Dean of the Faculty of Oriental Studies; Director of the International Center for Kerala Studies;  Member of the Advisory Committee for the Oriental Research Institute and Manuscripts Library and the Department of Malayalam Lexicon; the first Vice-Chairman of the Council Monitoring the Choice – based Credit and Semester System, introduced for the first time in any University in Kerala.

During his tenure as Professor of Linguistics in the University of Kerala, Dr Nayar organized a number of Seminars, Symposiums, Conferences and Workshops at the regional, state and national levels and successfully completed several Research Projects.
After his retirement from the University of Kerala, Dr Nayar served the following institutions as a Visiting Professor and in various capacities as presented here:

Publications

Malayalam
 Vivarthhanaththinte Bhaashaasaasthrabhuumika   (Translation -  Its Background Linguistics), State Institute of Languages, TVPM (SIL) 1974
 Svanavijnjaanam (Phonetics), SIL, 1980
 Lookabhaashakal (The World Languages)DC Books, 1987
 Ezhuththinte katha (The Story of Writing or the Letter), The Institute of Children's Literature, TVPM 1996
 Malayalam Malayaaliyolam (Malayalam as Much as the Malayaali) SIL, 1999
 Cherusseri (A literary biography of the author of Krishnagatha), Department of Publications, University of Kerala,1999
 Uchchaaranam nannaavaan (For Improvement in Pronunciation) SIL 2000
 Sailiibhamgikal (The Beauties of Style) SIL 2003
 Hari Nama Keerthanam (Annotated edition of the famous 16th century hymn) Thunchan Smaraka Samithi, TVPM-9, 2009
 Bhaashaasaasthradrshtiyiluute (From the View point of Linguistics), SIL 2009
 Draavidabhaashakal (Dravidian Languages Translation from English of MS Andranov's original book in Russian)SIL 1975
 Chittappetuththiya kathhakalippadangal (Notated Kathakali songs: An anthology of 20 select pieces with introduction and notes) Keralakalamandalam 2004
 SriLalitasasahasranaamasthothramliteral explanation for Lalita Sahasranamam – (Annotated Edition with an introduction)Thunchan Smaaraka Samithi, TVPM-9, 2011
 Malayalam Verbal Forms – Phonetics and Phonology of Colloquial Malayalam, with Experimental Findings, Dravidian Linguistics Association, TVPM 1972
	Malayalam: A Linguistic Description, National Research Publications, Kazhakuttam TVPM 1973
	Malayalam for Beginners, Swantham Books, TVPM-10; 1999
	Kathakali Texts in Translation (in Phillip B Zarrilli: Kathakali-Dance Drama Where Gods and Demons Come to Play 2003)
	Vidyarambham CD for Malayalam Self - Study (2001)
	Vision, insights and Innovation (Report of the Calicut University Commission, 2000)
   Malayalam for All India Service Offcier Trainees, Dr. V.R. Prabodhachandran Nayar, Publisher: Institute of Management in Government(IMG), Thiruvananthapuram, 2020
   Dr. K. Raghavan Pilla-a literary biography by Dr. VRP, State Institute of Languages, 2020
   Lalitha Ganangal Prabodha sangeetham Valyam-2, National Bookstall, Kottayam 2021 March.

Awards

	Dr. K Godavarma Memorial Gold medal (1959)
	Commonwealth Scholarship for post doctoral research at the School of Oriental and African Studies, Univ. of London (1967)
	IC Chacko Award of the Kerala Sahitya Akademy, for the best book in scientific literature (Swanavijnaanam) (Citation) (1981)
	CL Antony Award of the Trissur Sahridaya veedi (Citation) (1998)
	MKKNayar Award of the MKKNayar Memorial Cultural Institute, Pakalkuri  (Citation) (2002)
	NV Krishna Variar Award for scientific literature (2011)
	Sakthi Thaayaatt Award for scientific literature (2011)
	Professor CP Menon Award for scientific literature (Citation) (2013)
       (Mukunda Raajaa) Smriti Puraskaaram of Keralakalamandalam 9 November 2014)
       Shreshta Malayala Basha Puraskaram, Govt. of India, 4 April 2019.

See also
 Dravidian Linguistics Association
 Dravidian Languages

References

Living people
20th-century Indian linguists
1938 births
People from Ernakulam district
Malayalam-language writers
Writers from Kerala
Phoneticians
Scholars from Kerala
Malayali people